The East Branch Croton River is a tributary of the Croton River in  Dutchess, Putnam, and Westchester counties in the state of New York.  It lies within the Croton River watershed and is part of the New York City water supply system's Croton Watershed.

Path
The river rises in the town of Pawling in Dutchess County, flowing west and then south through the village of Pawling. It crosses into Putnam County, flowing through the Great Swamp in the town of Patterson. It then flows south, west and southwest through the town of Southeast, passing through the East Branch Reservoir, the village of Brewster, and the Diverting Reservoir. Finally, it crosses into Westchester County, joining the West Branch Croton River at the hamlet of Croton Falls in North Salem to form the main Croton River.

See also
List of rivers of New York

References

Rivers of New York (state)
Rivers of Westchester County, New York
Rivers of Dutchess County, New York
Rivers of Putnam County, New York
Tributaries of the Hudson River